Cyprus first appeared in the quadrennial Mediterranean Games in 1983, and has regularly continued to send athletes to the multi-sport event ever since.

Overview

By event

See also
Cyprus at the Olympics

External links
Medals table per country and per Games at the official International Committee of Mediterranean Games (CIJM) website